Nansel Bussa (born 15 June 2003) is a Nigerian footballer who currently plays as a forward for Ifeanyi Ubah.

Career statistics

Club

Notes

References

2003 births
Living people
Nigerian footballers
Association football forwards
Ifeanyi Ubah F.C. players
Nigeria Professional Football League players